Coors Light is a 4.2% (US) ABV light beer brewed in Golden, Colorado; Albany, Georgia; Elkton, Virginia; Fort Worth, Texas; Irwindale, California; and Milwaukee, Wisconsin. It was first produced in 1978 by the Coors Brewing Company. The Canadian version of Coors Light is 4.0% ABV and brewed by Molson Coors Canada Inc. in Moncton, New Brunswick; St.John's, Newfoundland; Longueuil, Quebec; Toronto, Ontario and Chilliwack, British Columbia. The parent company is the Molson Coors Beverage Company. In Australia and the United Kingdom, Coors Light is labelled as "Coors."

Coors Light has a "mountain icon" to represent the beer as part of the logo. As of 2020, the icon is a stylized drawing of a mountain with two peaks, along with the removal of their famous 'cold lined' can conditioning blue liner.

History
In the 1940s, the Coors Brewing Company introduced a beer called "Coors Light" that was lighter in body and calories.
It was discontinued at the start of World War II. After Miller Lite was introduced in 1973, Coors Light was reintroduced in 1978.

Marketing and advertising

Coors Light advertising highlights the quality of the beer as the most refreshing place on earth. Additionally, Coors Light ads are designed to target young demographics. The stories behind the ads seek to capture the attention of young people, situating them in cool places they would like to be. Cavalry Agency out of Chicago, IL, is no longer the current Advertising Agency for Coors Light. Cavalry was responsible for the 'Reach For The Cold' Campaign featuring the Coors Light Explorers. Additionally, in April 2013, the agency produced a Digital Video for Coors Light ad known as Coors Light the brewer ambushes a summer pool party with the frosty taste of winter. The television ad was considered the ad of the week in the Adweek publication.

Containers and packaging

The brewery introduced the tagline "perfect shot of refreshment" under the slogan of a “Silver Bullet”, a symbol of the silver can that holds the beer.

In May 2013, the Coors Light aluminum pint, featuring Ball Corporation Alumi-Tek® bottle, has been awarded a Gold Award from The Packaging Association (PAC) and was chosen as the Canadian Packaging Consumers Voice Award winner at the recent PAC Leadership Awards. The Coors Light aluminum pint was selected for its eye-catching graphics, recyclability and the convenience of the bottle's wide mouth and resealable closure.

Controversial can advertising claims

On August, 2013, the advertising industry's self-regulatory unit referred Miller Coors’ ad claims to the Federal Trade Commission (FTC). The claims that the FTC considered ad challenging included, “the world's most refreshing can," "beer on the inside, science on the outside" and "smoother, more refreshing pour," implying that the can was somehow technologically superior to other beer cans and provides a more refreshing beverage experience.

According to the National Advertising Division (NAD), Miller Coors declined to provide a substantive response to the challenge. Miller Coors defended the claims as either puffery or truthful. The company also told NAD that the television, radio and digital campaigns would be permanently discontinued by the end of September 2013.

International markets
In order to expand Molson Coors brand portfolio outside of its major markets (US, UK, Canada), Molson Coors established Molson Coors International in 2008. MCI operates in three primary regions; Asia, Europe, Latin America and the Caribbean. Coors Light, as a signature brand of Molson Coors, was introduced in the new markets. The world's sixth-largest brewer, which also makes Molson Canadian, Carling and Blue Moon, was trying to diversify beyond its core markets.

Awards and sponsorship 
In 2005, Coors light was awarded with a silver medal in the Great American Beer Festival in the American-Style Light Lager category.

MillerCoors' title sponsorship of the newly created Coors Light National Hockey League Stadium Series. MillerCoors' sponsorship of the stadium series is part of the beer company's seven-year, $375M deal signed with the NHL in February 2011, the league's most financially lucrative sponsorship ever.

In 2013, MillerCoors owned Coors Light inked a year-long deal with Turner Broadcasting, which includes a sponsorship of the NASCAR Mobile applications. Coors Light uses the sponsorship with in-application banners and content to connect with NASCAR's core demographic of sports fans. The initiative builds on Coors Light's previous mobile initiatives to target consumers by demographic.

Official MLB team sponsors 
 Arizona Diamondbacks
 Colorado Rockies
 Oakland Athletics
 San Diego Padres
 San Francisco Giants
 Seattle Mariners

Promotions 

In the 1990s, Coors Light sponsored what was then America's most dominant domestic professional cycling team, which included Olympians Alexi Grewal, Roy Knickman, and Davis Phinney.

In 2008, Coors Light became known as the "Official Beer of NASCAR", succeeding Budweiser.

In 2009, a Coors Light koozie depicting scenes from the 2010 Winter Olympics was offered in a limited number of cases that contained 28 bottles instead of 24. That same year, the Hillside Chalet Contest was created. The winner was given a 6-night stay in Whistler, British Columbia, during the 2010 Winter Olympics.

During 2012 and 2013, Coors Light partnered with Ice Cube for the Coors Light Search for the Coldest National Tour and Talent Search.

See also
Bud Light
Miller Lite

References

External links 
 
 Coors Foundation 
 Coors Light

Products introduced in 1978
American beer brands
Molson Coors brands